Argostoli (Katharevousa: Ἀργοστόλιον) is a town and a municipality on the island of Kefalonia, Ionian Islands, Greece. Since the 2019 local government reform it is one of the three municipalities on the island. It has been the capital and administrative centre of Kefalonia since 1757, following a population shift down from the old capital of Agios Georgios (also known as Kastro) to take advantage of the trading opportunities provided by the sheltered bay upon which Argostoli sits. Argostoli developed into one of the busiest ports in Greece, leading to prosperity and growth. The municipality has an area of 377.0 km2 and the municipal unit (the pre-2010 municipality) has an area of 157.670 km2. The 2011 census recorded a population of 10,633 in the Argostoli municipal unit, and 23,499 in the municipality in its post-2019 extension. Its largest towns are Argostóli (pop. 9,748), Razata (507), Dilináta (496) and Kompothekráta (449).

Urban landscape

To the east of Argostoli, at the end of the bay, beneath the aforementioned Castle of St. George, sits the Koutavos Lagoon, a feeding ground for the Loggerhead turtles (Caretta caretta). Now a nature reserve, the Koutavos Lagoon was once an almost impassable swamp where mosquitoes and malaria were rife.

During the period of British occupation of the Ionian Islands, Kefalonia's governor, General Sir Charles James Napier, constructed a wooden bridge across the lagoon.  This was done in 1813 by Colonel Charles Philip de Bosset, a Swiss engineer in the employ of the British army.
Four years later stone arches were added and, after some 26 years, the entire bridge was rebuilt in stone. In continuous use until 2005, this narrow bridge is now closed to traffic, currently undergoing renovation by the Greek Ministry of Culture. Almost halfway along the De-Bosset Bridge stands a stone column built by the British to celebrate their presence.

The coastal road out of Argostoli to the west was known during the Venetian period as the ‘Piccolo Gyro’. Along the Piccolo Gyro, in the Vlikha area facing Lixouri, lie the ‘Swallow Holes’ of Katovothres, a geological phenomenon. Sea water disappears underground and travels under the island, re-emerging around fourteen days later in the Karavomylos area of Sami, having passed through the nearby, underground Melissani lake. The power of this sea water was harnessed, in 1835, to power a water mill. Further along the Piccolo Gyro is the Agion Theodoron lighthouse, named after the small adjacent church. More commonly known as the Fanari lighthouse, this too was built during the British occupation, in 1829. The original building was destroyed in the earthquake of 1953, the recently restored present structure was rebuilt, complete with Doric-style columns, from the original plans.

Buildings that weren't shattered by German bombing in 1943 were destroyed in 1953 by the earthquake that razed virtually all of Kefalonia, apart from the Fiskardo area, to the ground.

Opposite the Archaeological Museum of Argostoli are the law courts, originally constructed by the British with stone from the Cyclopean site at nearby Krani. Along Lithostroto, next to the Catholic Church, is a tiny museum (open some mornings and most evenings) dedicated to the soldiers of the Acqui Division. A little further along is the Bell Tower, rebuilt in 1985 to house the original clock mechanism.

On the Ionian Sea coast southwest of the town centre is the holiday resort town Lassi, which has several small beaches.

Subdivisions
Following the Kapodistrias reform of 1997, communities around the town united to form a larger municipality of Argostoli, which included the settlements of Spilia, Helmata, Kompothekrata, Lassi, Minies and ten former communities: Agona, Davgata, Dilinata, Zola, Thinia, Kourouklata, Nifi, Troyiannata, Faraklata and Farsa. As a result of the 2010 Kallikratis Programme, this municipality became a municipal unit of the municipality of Kefalonia, which covered the whole island. In 2019 three new municipalities were formed on the island, including Argostoli.

The municipality of Argostoli consists of the following municipal units (former municipalities):
 Argostoli
 Eleios-Pronnoi
 Leivatho
 Omala

The municipal unit of Argostoli is subdivided into the following communities. Constituent villages are given in brackets:
Agkonas
Argostoli (Argostoli, Kokolata, Kompothekrata, Minia)
Davgata
Dilinata
Faraklata (Faraklata, Drapano, Prokopata, Razata)
Farsa
Thinaia (Kardakata)
Kourouklata
Nyfi
Troianata (Troianata, Demoutsantata, Mitakata)
Zola

Transportation

Between the Koutavos Lagoon and the De-Bosset Bridge is the new bus station which connects Argostoli with the other towns and some of the villages on the island, as well as with Athens and Patras. The main ferry port, connecting Argostoli with the mainland (via Kyllini) and Zakynthos (also known as Zante) is next to this building with the Lixouri ferry (once an hour in winter, twice an hour in summer) docking a little further along.

 Car ferry service to Kyllini (mainland) and Zakynthos (Zante)
 Car ferry to Lixouri
 KTEL Bus service to Athens, via Kyllini, Patras and the Corinth Canal bridge
 Infrequent bus service to Poros, Sami, Skala, Fiskardo and various villages en route
 Frequent summer service to Lassi, Airport & Ai Chelis, Lourdas, Ammes, Myrtos & Antisamos.
 Transit bus service is provided between the Airport and the city of Argostoli (only during summer season). There is a public bus stop in front of the terminal building. Tickets can be purchased by the bus driver.
 Scheduled flights to  Zakynthos and Athens, charter flight in summer, via Kefalonia Airport
 Taxis from Plateia Valianos and seafront, car and motorcycle/scooter hire

Climate

Historical population

People

 Gerasimos Arsenis (1931–2016), politician
 Renée Toole Kahane (1907-2002), philologist
 Aris Maliagros (1895–1984), actor
 Andreas Metaxas (1786–1860), politician
 Ioannis Metaxas (1871–1941), general, politician and dictator
 Constantine Phaulkon (1647–1688), merchant and adventurer
 Antonis Tritsis (1937–1992), mayor of Athens
 Christian Zervos (1889–1970), art collector, writer and publisher
 Gerasimos Pitzamanos (1787–1825), painter and architect
 Ioannis Karantinos (1784 -1834), Greek mathematician
 Athanassios S. Fokas (born 1952), Greek mathematician

International relations 
Argostoli is twinned with:

 Šabac in Serbia.
 Brăila in Romania.

See also
List of settlements in Cephalonia

References

External links

Argostoli Kefalonia
Lassi Kefalonia | Tourist Guide KefaloniaVisit.com
Municipality of Argostoli official website
GTP – Argostoli
GTP – Municipality of Argosoli
Kefalonia Useful Information (PDF)
Argostoli the captivating capital of Kefalonia

 
Mediterranean port cities and towns in Greece
Greek prefectural capitals
Populated places in Cephalonia
Municipalities of the Ionian Islands (region)